Dr. C.V. Raman University is a private university located in Kota, Chhattisgarh, India. Established on 3 November 2006 by All India Society for Electronics & Computer Technology (AISECT). It is named after C.V. Raman.

Faculties
The university comprises the following faculties:
Faculty of Engineering and Technology
Faculty of Computer Science and Information Technology
Faculty of Humanities
Faculty of Commerce
Faculty of Education
Faculty of Journalism
Faculty of Law
Faculty of Management
Faculty of Science
Faculty of Open and Distance Learning Education.

References

External links

GOVT. SHYAMA PRASAD
MUKHARJEE COLLEGE,
SITAPUR, SARGUJA
(C.G.)
GOVT. SHYAMA PRASAD
MUKHARJEE
COLLEGE,SITAPUR
REGIONAL
CENTRE, DR. C. V.
RAMAN
AMBIKAPUR
List_Of_Proposed_Study_Centre.pdf

Educational institutions established in 2006
2006 establishments in Chhattisgarh
Universities in Chhattisgarh
Bilaspur district, Chhattisgarh